Clelia is a genus of snakes, one of three genera with species with the common name mussurana or musurana (Portuguese: muçurana)  It is a genus of large snakes in the family Colubridae. The genus is endemic to Central America and South America, and species of Clelia are found from southern Mexico to Brazil. They specialize in ophiophagy, i.e., they attack and eat other snakes. Currently seven species are recognized as being valid.

Species
The genus Clelia contains the following species which are currently recognized:
Clelia clelia  – black mussurana, windward cribo 
Clelia equatoriana  – equatorial mussarana
Clelia errabunda  – Underwood's mussurana, Saint Lucia cribo (extinct)
Clelia hussami 
Clelia langeri 
Clelia plumbea 
Clelia scytalina  – Mexican snake eater

Nota bene: A binomial authority in parentheses indicates that the species was originally described in a genus other than Clelia.

Etymology
The specific name, hussami, is in honor Brazilian herpetologist Hussam Zaher.

The specific name, langeri, is in honor of German-born Dominican friar Brother Andres Langer, who is a missionary in Pampagrande, Bolivia.

Description
When young, the dorsal color is light pink, which becomes lead-blue when adult. The ventral color is whitish yellow. They have 10 to 15 teeth at the front of the upper jaw, which are followed, after a space, by two enlarged grooved teeth at the back of the mouth (opisthoglyphous teeth) which they use to grasp the head of the attacked snake and push it into the gullet. Then they coil around the prey, killing it by constriction (this is the reason these species are called pseudoboas). Ingestion of the whole body follows. The long body of the ingested snake is compressed as a wave in order to fit into the mussuranas' gastrointestinal system.

Reproduction
Mussaranas are oviparous.

Venom
Although mussuranas are rear-fanged and produce a mild venom, these snakes pose no danger to humans. Even when handled they usually do not bite. Very few envenomations have been reported and they were not fatal.  Mussuranas are immune to the venom of the snakes they feed upon, particularly the smaller Central and South American pit vipers of the genus Bothrops. They are not immune to the venom of the coral snake, though. In the absence of other snakes, mussuranas can feed also on small mammals. It has been reported that at least some captive specimens will accept only live snakes as prey.

Habitat and behavior
The preferred habitat of mussuranas is dense ground-level vegetation. They are diurnal.

Conservation
    
In some regions, farmers keep mussuranas as pets in order to keep their living environment clear of pit vipers, which claim annually a large number of deaths of domestic animals, like cattle. In the 1930s a Brazilian plan to breed and release large numbers of mussuranas for the control of pit vipers was tried but did not work. The Butantan Institute in São Paulo, which specializes in the production of antivenins, erected a statue of Clelia clelia as its symbol and a tribute to its usefulness in combating venomous snake bites. Mussuranas' immunity to bothropic venom was studied by the Brazilian scientist Vital Brazil in the 1920s. Mussuranas are increasingly rare due to the disappearance of their prey and have disappeared in many habitats.

References

Further reading
Ditmars RL  (1936).  The Reptiles of North America.  New York: Doubleday and Co. 476 pp., 135 plates.  (Notes: Trimorphodon, Leptodeira capable of poisonous bites; mentions boomslang, possibly mussurana, dangerous.)
Fitzinger LI (1826). Neue Classification der Reptilien nach ihren natürlichen Verwandtschaften. Nebst einer Verwandtschafts-tafel und einem Verzeichnisse der Reptilien-Sammlung des K. K. zoologischen Museum's zu Wien. Vienna: J.G. Heubner. five unnumbered + 67 pp. + one plate. (Clelia, new genus, p. 55). (in German and Latin).
Roosevelt, Theodore  (1914).  Through the Brazilian Wilderness.  New York: Charles Scribner’s Sons. 410 pp.  (Notes: Throughout the book, the snake is commonly referred to as the "mussurama [sic]").

External links

Mussurana Care Sheet
Photograph from the wild: mussurana 1, common lancehead 0.
 discussion forum (about venom of musurana)

Mussuranas
Snakes of Central America
Snakes of South America
Clelia
Reptiles of Brazil
Reptiles of Costa Rica
Reptiles of Guatemala
Reptiles of Guyana
Taxa named by Leopold Fitzinger